The Singles Collection 2001–2011 is a compilation album released by British virtual band Gorillaz on 28 November 2011. The album is a collection of the group's singles released between 2001 and 2011, except The Fall. The album is available in four different editions: standard, deluxe, 12" vinyl and 7" single box set.

Track listing

Song origins
 "Tomorrow Comes Today", "Clint Eastwood", "19-2000" and "Rock the House", and also the remixes of "Clint Eastwood" and "19-2000" are from Gorillaz (2001)
 "Feel Good Inc.", "DARE", "Dirty Harry", "Kids with Guns" and "El Mañana" are from Demon Days (2005)
 "Stylo", "Superfast Jellyfish", "On Melancholy Hill" and "Rhinestone Eyes" are from Plastic Beach (2010)
 "Doncamatic" is a non-album single.

Charts

Weekly charts

Year-end charts

Certifications

References

2011 compilation albums
Gorillaz albums
Albums produced by Damon Albarn
Parlophone compilation albums
Virgin Records compilation albums